Frederick Hind Scott (6 October 1916 – September 1995) was an English professional footballer who played as a winger in the Football League for York City and Nottingham Forest, in non-League football for Fatfield Juniors and Washington Colliery Mechanics and was on the books of Bolton Wanderers and Bradford Park Avenue without making a league appearance. He was an England schools international.

References

1916 births
Footballers from Tyne and Wear
1995 deaths
English footballers
England schools international footballers
Association football forwards
Bolton Wanderers F.C. players
Bradford (Park Avenue) A.F.C. players
York City F.C. players
Nottingham Forest F.C. players
Washington F.C. players
English Football League players
People from Fatfield